Frank Miller (1842–1925) was an American cryptographer, banker, and trustee of Stanford University. He invented the one-time pad in 1882, 35 years before the patent issued to Gilbert Vernam.

Born in Milwaukee, Wisconsin, in 1842, he graduated from Yale University and then joined the Union Army during the American Civil War, where he was wounded during the Second Battle of Bull Run.

References

1842 births
1925 deaths
Pre-computer cryptographers
Yale University alumni
Businesspeople from Milwaukee
Union Army soldiers
Businesspeople from Sacramento, California